The women's pole vault event at the 2017 European Athletics U23 Championships was held in Bydgoszcz, Poland, at Zdzisław Krzyszkowiak Stadium on 13 and 15 July.

Medalists

Results

Qualification
13 July

Qualification rule: 4.20 (Q) or the 12 best results (q) qualified for the final.

Final
15 July

References

Pole vault
Pole vault at the European Athletics U23 Championships